Rural Township is located in Rock Island County, Illinois. As of the 2010 census, its population was 988 and it contained 389 housing units. The township, located south of Moline, Illinois, was formed from Coal Valley Township prior to 1839.

History
Rural Township was formed out of Coal Valley Township prior to 1839. The first settlers of the region were Thomas and Davis Goodlow. The first schoolhouse was built in the township in 1846. In 1848, the nearest habitation was in Milan (then Camden Hills), and the nearest post office was in Rock Island.

Geography

Demographics

References

External links
 US Census
 Illinois State Archives

Townships in Rock Island County, Illinois
Townships in Illinois